Neopimpla is a genus of ichneumonid wasp. A junior synonym, Microceratops, was intermittently applied to a genus of ceratopsian dinosaur currently renamed as Microceratus.

References

Ichneumonidae